The Australasian rugby league team represented Australia and New Zealand in rugby league sporadically between 1910 and 1922. Administered by the New South Wales Rugby League, appearances for the team were counted towards the Australian team's records and playing register but not the New Zealand team's. The team toured Great Britain twice, participating in two Ashes series, and also played Great Britain twice in Sydney.

1910
The Australasian side first played in 1910. After Great Britain had defeated Australia in two Test matches it was decided that two games would be played between Australasia and Great Britain. The team played in the Australian jersey's sky blue with maroon hoops, with the addition of black hoops to represent New Zealand.

1911–12

Following individual tours by New Zealand and Australia in 1907–08 and 1908–09 respectively, the Northern Rugby Football Union invited an 'Australasian' team to tour Great Britain during the 1911–12 season. They became the first tourists to win the Ashes.

Prior to the tour a three-way series of matches between New South Wales, Queensland and New Zealand was organised as a basis of selection for the tour. The New South Welshmen dominated the touring side, with four New Zealanders and only one Queenslander selected. However, counted amongst the New South Welshmen was Con Sullivan, who had moved to Australia from New Zealand a few years before.

7 October 1911 win v Wales, 28–20 at Ebbw Vale, Wales (7,000)
18 October 1911 win v England, 11–6 at Fulham, England (6,000)

6 December 1911 loss v England, 3–5 at Nottingham (3,000)

1921–22

The Australasian Kangaroos again toured Great Britain during the 1921–1922 season.

During 1921 the New Zealand side toured Australia, playing matches against New South Wales and Queensland, which served as selection trials for the upcoming 'Australasian' team's tour, for which only one New Zealander, Bert Laing, selected. The team wore the sky blue jersey of New South Wales and the only non-New South Welsh player to appear in a test was Queenslander Billy Richards in the third.

References

National rugby league teams
Rugby league in Australia
Rugby league in New Zealand
Rugby league representative teams in Australia
New Zealand national rugby league team
Australasia